The 2010 congressional elections in New York were held on November 2, 2010 to determine representation from the state of New York in the United States House of Representatives. New York had 29 seats in the House. Representatives are elected to two-year terms.

The election marked the first time that New York used electronic voting, as the state was the last to implement the process under the Help America Vote Act.

Republican candidates prevailed in a total of eight congressional races in New York, while Democratic candidates prevailed in the other 21; thus, the GOP gained a total of six House seats in New York. The closest race occurred in New York's 1st congressional district, where Republican candidate Randy Altschuler did not concede to Democratic incumbent Congressman Tim Bishop until December 8.

Overview
Results of the 2010 United States House of Representatives elections in New York by district:

District 1

Democratic, Working Families and Independence incumbent Tim Bishop was challenged by Republican and Conservative Party nominee Randy Altschuler, a local businessman.  It was the last undecided congressional election in the country when Altschuler conceded on December 8, 2010.

In the Republican primary, Altschuler won against George Demos, an attorney and prosecutor who worked on Bernard Madoff's case. State Republican Party chairman Edward F. Cox was allegedly trying to dissuade primary challengers to his son Christopher Nixon Cox, grandson of former President Richard Nixon. Bishop had roughly $1 million cash on hand, while Altschuler had raised $800,000. A February 2010 SurveyUSA poll showed Bishop with a slight 47% to 45% lead over Altschuler.

On election night, Bishop had a 3,500 vote lead.  However, after voting machines were rechecked, Altschuler had a 400-vote lead.  Following a partial recount of absentee ballots, Bishop reportedly held a 15-vote lead on November 19. Altschuler conceded the election on December 8, 2010; Bishop led by a 263-vote margin.
NY - District 1 at OurCampaigns.com
Race ranking and details from CQ Politics
Campaign contributions from OpenSecrets
Race profile at The New York Times

Polling

Results

District 2

Democratic, Working Families and Independence Party incumbent Steve Israel ran for reelection, challenged by Republican and Conservative Party nominee John Gomez and Constitution Party nominee Anthony Tolda. Gomez, a good friend of author Mark Levin, was a favorite of the Tea Party movement. An attorney and former radio personality, he was encouraged to run by Sean Hannity, a childhood friend. Gomez was endorsed by Alaska Gov. Sarah Palin. Israel won the general election on November 2, 2010.

Race profile at The New York Times

District 3

Republican, Conservative, Independence and Tax Revolt Party incumbent Peter T. King ran for reelection, challenged by Democratic nominee Howard Kudler. The district was located in Nassau County on Long Island and was considered a safe Republican district. King won reelection on November 2, 2010.
Race ranking and details from CQ Politics
Campaign contributions from OpenSecrets
Race profile at The New York Times

Results

District 4

Democratic and Working Families incumbent Carolyn McCarthy was challenged by Republican, Conservative, Independence and Tax Revolt Party nominee Fran Becker. McCarthy won reelection on November 2, 2010.
Race ranking and details from CQ Politics
Campaign contributions from OpenSecrets
Race profile at The New York Times

Polling

Result

District 5

Democratic, Working Families and Independence incumbent Gary Ackerman was challenged by Republican and Conservative Party nominee Dr. James Milano and Libertarian and Tax Revolt Party nominee Elizabeth Berney. The district, which stretched from eastern Queens across the Town of North Hempstead, was historically Democratic, and Ackerman won the general election on November 2, 2010.

Race ranking and details from CQ Politics
Campaign contributions from OpenSecrets
Race profile at The New York Times

Results

District 6

Democratic incumbent Gregory Meeks ran for reelection, challenged by Republican and Conservative Party nominee Asher Taub. Meeks won the general election on November 2, 2010.
Race ranking and details from CQ Politics
Campaign contributions from OpenSecrets
Race profile at The New York Times

Results

District 7

Democratic and Working Families incumbent Joe Crowley ran for reelection, challenged by Republican and Conservative Party nominee Ken Reynolds and Green Party nominee Anthony Gronowicz. Crowley won the general election.
Race ranking and details from CQ Politics
Campaign contributions from OpenSecrets
Race profile at The New York Times

Results

District 8

Democratic and Working Families incumbent Jerry Nadler ran for reelection, challenged by Republican and Conservative Party nominee Susan Kone. The district covers parts of Brooklyn and Manhattan. Nadler won the general election on November 2, 2010.
Race ranking and details from CQ Politics
Campaign contributions from OpenSecrets
Race profile at The New York Times

Results

District 9

Democratic, Working Families and Independence Party incumbent Anthony Weiner ran for reelection, challenged by Republican and Conservative Party nominee Bob Turner. Weiner won the general election on November 2, 2010. Later, after Weiner resigned due to a sex scandal, Turner won the seat in September 2011.
Race ranking and details from CQ Politics
Campaign contributions from OpenSecrets
Race profile at The New York Times

Results

District 10

Democratic incumbent Ed Towns ran for reelection, challenged by Republican nominee Diana Muñiz and Conservative Party nominee Ernest Johnson. Towns won the general election on November 2, 2010.
Race ranking and details from CQ Politics
Campaign contributions from OpenSecrets
Race profile at The New York Times

Results

District 11

Democratic and Working Families incumbent Yvette Clarke ran for reelection, challenged by Republican and Conservative Party nominee Hugh C. Carr. The 11th district is wholly within the borough of Brooklyn. Clarke won the general election on November 2, 2010.
Race ranking and details from CQ Politics
Campaign contributions from OpenSecrets
Race profile at The New York Times

Results

District 12

Democratic and Working Families incumbent Nydia Velazquez ran for reelection, challenged by Conservative Party nominee Alice Gaffney. Velazquez won the general election on November 2, 2010.
Race ranking and details from CQ Politics
Campaign contributions from OpenSecrets
Race profile at The New York Times

Results

District 13

Democratic and Independence incumbent Michael McMahon was challenged by Republican and Conservative Party nominee Michael Grimm, a former FBI Special Agent, and Libertarian nominee Tom Vendittelli. The 13th district covers the entire Staten Island and parts of south Brooklyn.

In the Republican primary, Grimm ran against the director of government relations for the Climate Group Michael Allegretti. Vito Fossella had earlier been rumored to be considering a comeback, but did not run. Allegretti had the support of the Republican County Committees of Kings and Richmond Counties. Grimm had the support of the Conservative Party's county committees. According to an April 2010 Global Strategy Group poll, McMahon led Grimm and Allegretti 56% to 23% and 56% to 24%, respectively.

Grimm won the general election, unseating McMahon, on November 2, 2010.
Race ranking and details from CQ Politics
Campaign contributions from OpenSecrets
Race profile at The New York Times

Polling

Results

District 14

Democratic and Working Families incumbent Carolyn Maloney was challenged by Republican nominee David Ryan Brumberg, Conservative Party nominee Timothy J. Healy, and Independence Party nominee Dino L. LaVerghetta. Maloney considered running for Senate against Kirsten Gillibrand, but decided against it. In the Democratic primary, she defeated Reshma Saujani. 

Maloney was heavily favored, but the Republicans had held legislative seats in this district as recently as 2002. Maloney won the general election on November 2, 2010.

The district in on the Manhattan East Side and includes portions of Queens.
Race ranking and details from CQ Politics
Campaign contributions from OpenSecrets
Race profile at The New York Times

Results

District 15

Democratic and Working Families incumbent Charles B. Rangel ran for reelection, challenged by Republican, Conservative and Jobs Now Party nominee Michel Faulkner,  Independence and Vote People for Change Party nominee Craig Schley, and Socialist Worker nominee Roger Calero.

Rangel, who had served the Harlem-area district since 1971, faced a primary challenge from Adam Clayton Powell IV, Vincent Morgan and labor activist Jonathan Tasini.

Rangel won the general election on November 2, 2010.
Race ranking and details from CQ Politics
Campaign contributions from OpenSecrets
Race profile at The New York Times

Results

District 16

Democratic and Working Families incumbent Jose Serrano ran for reelection, challenged by Republican and Conservative Party nominee Frank Della Valle. The district lies entirely within the Bronx. Serrano won the general election on November 2, 2010.
Race ranking and details from CQ Politics
Campaign contributions from OpenSecrets
Race profile at The New York Times

Results

District 17

Democratic and Working Families incumbent Eliot Engel ran for reelection, challenged by Republican nominee Anthony Mele and Conservative Party nominee York Kleinhandler. The district encompasses parts of the Bronx, Westchester, and Rockland Counties.

Engel won 79% of the vote in 2008, 76% in 2006 and 2004, and 62% in 2002 when he defeated Rockland County Executive C. Scott Vanderhoef. In 2000, he fought back the primary challenge of State Senator Larry Seabrook. Election experts predicted that Engel would post similar numbers in 2010.

Army veteran York Kleinhandler received GOP and Conservative Party endorsements from the party committees in the Bronx, Rockland County and Westchester County. Kleinhandler faced a Republican primary of his own against Tea Party candidate Anthony Mele in September, a primary that brought local Republicans to physical blows and led to police involvement. He was also dogged by accusations "for predatory business practices against senior citizens" in Florida.

Engel won the general election on November 2, 2010.
Race ranking and details from CQ Politics
Campaign contributions from OpenSecrets
Race profile at The New York Times

Results

District 18

Democratic, Working Families and Independence incumbent Nita Lowey was challenged unsuccessfully by Republican and Conservative Party nominee (and former Republican nominee) Jim Russell and write-in candidate Cortes DeRussy.

Lowey was first elected in 1988 (defeating Joseph J. DioGuardi) and had had few challenges since. Venture capitalist Paul Wasserman, who would have run against her as a Republican, backed out in July 2010. Mark Rosen, seen by many as the strongest competitor, was recalled to military service just as his campaign was gaining traction. Theologian James C. Russell held the Republican and Conservative ballot lines, but the Republican Party disowned him after an essay in which he supported racial segregation surfaced; they had no way of removing him from the ballot. The Republicans then endorsed write-in candidate Cortes DeRussy.  Lowey won the general election on November 2, 2010.
Race ranking and details from CQ Politics
Campaign contributions from OpenSecrets
Race profile at The New York Times

Results

District 19

Democratic and Working Families incumbent John Hall ran for reelection, challenged by Republican, Conservative and Independence nominee Nan Hayworth. Hayworth prevailed by six points. 
NY - District 19 from OurCampaigns.com
Race ranking and details from CQ Politics
Campaign contributions from OpenSecrets
Race profile at The New York Times

Polling

Results

{{Election box candidate no change
  |party      = Total
  |candidate  = Nan Hayworth
  |votes      = 109,944
  |percentage = 50.42'  }}

District 20*

Democratic, Working Families and Independence Party incumbent Scott Murphy was challenged by Republican and Conservative Party nominee Chris Gibson, a retired U.S. Army colonel.

Murphy had won a 2009 special election for the seat which was called after Kirsten Gillibrand was appointed to the United States Senate in January.

Gibson unseated Murphy on November 2, 2010.
Race ranking and details from CQ Politics
Campaign contributions from OpenSecrets
Race profile at The New York TimesPolling

Results

District 21

Democratic, Working Families and Independence Party incumbent Paul Tonko ran for reelection, challenged by Republican Conservative Party nominee Ted Danz. The district lies in the Capital District of New York, including Albany, Schenectady, and Troy. Tonko won the general election on November 2, 2010.
Race ranking and details from CQ Politics
Campaign contributions from OpenSecrets
Race profile at The New York TimesResults

District 22

Democratic incumbent Maurice Hinchey and Working Families and Independence Party candidate ran successfully for reelection, defeating  Republican and Conservative Party challenger George Phillips. 
Race ranking and details from CQ Politics
Campaign contributions from OpenSecrets
Race profile at The New York TimesPolling

Results

District 23

Democratic and Working Families incumbent Bill Owens ran for reelection, challenged by Republican and Independence nominee Matt Doheny. Conservative Party nominee Doug Hoffman, who lost to Doheny in a Republican primary, was also on the ballot, but he suspended his campaign on October 5, 2010.

Owens had won this seat in a 2009 special election by a margin of 48.7% to 46.5% (3024 votes) over Conservative Party of New York nominee Hoffman after Republican Dierdre Scozzafava suspended her campaign and endorsed Owens less than three days before the election. Prominent Republicans, including former vice presidential candidate Sarah Palin, Minnesota Gov. Tim Pawlenty, and former New York Governor George Pataki endorsed Hoffman instead of Scozzafava, who had been picked by Republican county chairs. 

On November 2, 2010, Owens was re-elected to a full term over Doheny with a second plurality win, with Hoffman's vote tally exceeding Owens's margin of victory.
Race ranking and details from CQ Politics
Campaign contributions from OpenSecrets
Race profile at The New York TimesPolling

Results

District 24*

Democratic incumbent Michael Arcuri lost in 2010 to Republican, Conservative and Independence Party nominee Richard L. Hanna, whom Arcuri had narrowly defeated in 2008.

The Libertarian Party of New York backed 25-year-old Ernest Logan Bell  and headed a petition drive to get him onto the ballot.
NY - District 24 from OurCampaigns.com
Race ranking and details from CQ Politics
Campaign contributions from OpenSecrets
Race profile at The New York TimesHanna won the general election, unseating Arcuri on November 2, 2010.

Polling

†Internal poll for Arcuri campaign

Results

District 25

Democratic and Working Families incumbent Dan Maffei ran for reelection, challenged by Republican, Conservative and Independence Party nominee Ann Marie Buerkle. 

In the Republican primary, Buerkle defeated farmer and government reform advocate Mark Bitz and local leader Paul Bertan. Former congressional candidate David Gay had dropped out of the race earlier and endorsed Buerkle. 

In February, 2009, Greenberg Quinlan Rosner and Public Opinion Strategies National Public Radio classified the NY-25th as one of 60 "Most Competitive" Democratically held districts. Maffei was targeted by the NRCC for his vote in favor of the Recovery and Reinvestment Act and the Patient Protection and Affordable Care Act. 
Cook listed the race as "Likely Democratic" and CQ as "Democrat Favored".

Though Maffei was favored, Buerkle defeated him on Election Day. 

Race ranking and details from CQ Politics
Campaign contributions from OpenSecrets
Race profile at The New York TimesPolling

Results

District 26

Republican, Conservative and Independence Party incumbent Chris Lee ran for reelection, challenged by Democratic nominee Philip A. Fedele. Lee won the general election on November 2, 2010, only to resign three months later after it became known that he had sent a suggestive photo to a woman other than his wife.
Race ranking and details from CQ Politics
Campaign contributions from OpenSecrets
Race profile at The New York TimesResults

District 27

Democratic and Working Families incumbent Brian Higgins ran for reelection, challenged by Republican, Conservative and Taxpayers Party nominee Leonard Roberto, an Akron native and a leader in the local branch of the Tea Party movement. Roberto declared his candidacy against Higgins on April 13, 2010. The district included Chautauqua County and a large portion of Erie County, including a portion of the city of Buffalo. 

Higgins won reelection on November 2, 2010.
Race ranking and details from CQ Politics
Campaign contributions from OpenSecrets
Race profile at The New York TimesResults

District 28

Democratic, Working Families and Independence Party incumbent Louise Slaughter ran for reelection, challenged by Republican and Conservative Party nominee Jill A. Rowland.

Two candidates were put forth by competing factions of the Tea Party movement. Rowland, a dentist, was originally mentioned as a candidate for Higgins's seat, but was persuaded by a faction of the party led by Rus Thompson to run against Slaughter instead. The faction led by James Ostrowski supported Michael Giuliano, a 29-year-old legal publication editor and attorney allied with Ron Paul, but Giuliano dropped out of the race in July 2010.

Slaughter won against Eddie Egriu in the Democratic primary, and she is widely predicted to keep her seat without any serious competition. Fred Smerlas, a former Buffalo Bills defensive tackle who currently resides in Massachusetts, had expressed an interest in returning to Western New York to challenge her, but later stated that he would not do so this election cycle.

Slaughter won the general election on November 2, 2010.
Race ranking and details from CQ Politics
Campaign contributions from OpenSecrets
Race profile at The New York TimesResults

 

District 29*

District 29 was an open seat. The candidates on the ballot were Democratic and Working Families nominee Matthew Zeller and Republican, Conservative and Independence Party nominee Tom Reed. "Tea Party" candidate Janice Volk ran as a write-in candidate. Reed defeated Zeller in both the special election to fill the open seat and the general election for the term beginning on January 3, 2011. 

On March 3, 2010, incumbent Democrat Eric Massa announced that he would retire following reports that he had suffered a recurrence of cancer and allegations of sexual harassment. Massa later announced his resignation effective March 8. 

Reed, the outgoing mayor of Corning, announced his candidacy in 2009 and is the Republican nominee. Monroe County executive Maggie Brooks, state senator Catharine Young and Kuhl himself publicly acknowledged they were considering running, but all three backed Reed.Barr, Andy (2010-03-04). John "Randy" Kuhl eyes Eric Massa's seat. The Politico. Retrieved 2010-03-04 

The Democrats selected Zeller as their candidate. Zeller, who was largely unknown until his selection, did not live in the state of New York, but claimed to be a "native" of several towns ranging from Rochester to the Southern Tier. 

Shortly after Massa's departure, Rothenberg and CQ shifted the race to a toss-up and Cook moved it into the "Lean Republican" category. National Review, on the other hand, considered the race to be one of the easiest of the competitive races for a Republican takeover, on the order of "defeating the St. Louis Rams" (the worst team in the NFL in 2009).

The 2010 election was the last election for the (numerically) 29th district. In December 2010, the United States Census Bureau announced that New York would lose two congressional seats based on the results of the 2010 United States Census. It could possibly be dissolved, or renumbered with another county from the east (Tioga County) attached to it while another district (almost certain to be upstate, with candidates being the current 20th, 23rd, 24th or one of the Buffalo districts) is broken up.Fusco, Jennifer. U.S. Census could mean state loses House seats. Observer-Dispatch; April 11, 2009
Race ranking and details from CQ Politics
Campaign contributions from OpenSecrets
Race profile at The New York TimesPolling

Results

 

Key
*A district that has a partisan voting index of a party that is represented by the opposite party, and applies to an EVEN score

References

External links
New York State Board of Elections
Official candidate list (general election)
Primary results at The New York TimesU.S. Congress candidates for New York at Project Vote Smart
New York U.S. House from OurCampaigns.com
Campaign contributions for U.S. Congressional races in New York from OpenSecrets
2010 New York General Election graph of multiple polls from Pollster.comHouse - New York from the Cook Political Report''

New York
2010
United States House of Representatives